The 1990 Ohio Bobcats football team was an American football team that represented Ohio University in the Mid-American Conference (MAC) during the 1990 NCAA Division I-A football season. In their first season under head coach Tom Lichtenberg, the Bobcats compiled a 1–9–1 record (0–7–1 against MAC opponents), finished in last place in the MAC, and were outscored by all opponents by a combined total of 342 to 162.  They played their home games in Peden Stadium in Athens, Ohio.

Schedule

References

Ohio
Ohio Bobcats football seasons
Ohio Bobcats football